Edla Lyytinen (née Julkunen; 1 October 1874 – 21 May 1919) was a Finnish politician, born in Kuopion maalaiskunta. She was a Member of the Parliament of Finland for a short time in 1919, from 1 April until her death on 21 May 1919.

References

1874 births
1919 deaths
People from Kuopio
People from Kuopio Province (Grand Duchy of Finland)
Social Democratic Party of Finland politicians
Members of the Parliament of Finland (1919–22)
Women members of the Parliament of Finland